Alberto Porro Carmona (born 17 October 1980) is a Spanish conductor, composer, author, lecturer, teacher and saxophonist.

Biography 
He has led many big bands, both in Europe and America, and has won many awards for his music and banditry. He has played concerts around the world including Spain, France, Belgium, Portugal, Italy, Germany, Iceland, United Kingdom, Argentina, Chile, Brazil, Paraguay and Cuba.

Carmona works as a music director and teaches at the Akureyri Music School. He also teaches at the University of Akureyri.

References 

Spanish composers
Spanish male composers
1980 births
Living people